The Baltic Pipeline System (BPS) is a Russian oil transport system operated by the oil pipeline company Transneft. The BPS transports oil from the Timan-Pechora region, West Siberia and Urals-Volga regions to Primorsk oil terminal at the eastern part of the Gulf of Finland.

History
The project started in 1997 and construction was completed in December 2001. In April 2006 the Baltic Pipeline System reached full design capacity.

Technical features
Main elements of the BPS-1 are:

 Yaroslavl-Kirishi pipeline
 Kirishi pumping station
 Kirishi-Primorsk pipeline
 Oil terminal in Primorsk.

The capacity of the BPS-1 is 76.5 million tons of oil per year.

Controversy
During planning and construction stages the project was criticized by environmentalists, mainly because of the Baltic Sea's status as a particularly sensitive sea area and Primorsk’s proximity to the Beryozovye Islands nature reserve, a major bird sanctuary protected by the Ramsar Convention.

BPS-2

The construction of the BPS-2 started on 10 June 2009 and it entered in function in late March 2012.

See also

 Druzhba pipeline
 Caspian Pipeline Consortium
 Sever Pipeline

References

External links
 Baltic Pipeline System - environmental safety and reliability, Transneft

Energy infrastructure completed in 2001
Oil pipelines in Russia